DeVaughn Walter Nixon (born July 8, 1983) is an American actor. He is known for his roles in The Bodyguard, Terminator 2: Judgment Day, and Sugar Hill, and television series such as Winning Time: The Rise of the Lakers Dynasty, Mackenzie Falls, and Marvel's Runaways.

Early life and education
Nixon was born in Los Angeles in 1983, where he also lived his childhood. He is the son of former basketball player Norm Nixon, whom he portrays in the HBO series Winning Time: The Rise of the Lakers Dynasty. His stepmother is actress/producer/director/dancer Debbie Allen and half siblings  include dancer Vivian Nixon, and basketball player Norman Ellard Nixon Jr. He is married to Lara Nixon. When he was a child he voiced one of the characters in the animated film Bébé's Kids. Later, he had a role in the film The Bodyguard, along with other roles in other films and TV series. However, he temporarily left his film career to devote himself to his studies. He graduated in television production and business finance from Loyola Marymount University.

Career
He returned to his work in film and television after a brief career as a mortgage broker, participating first in the film Monster Heroes. In 2011 he starred in the film Prom. He then appeared in several guest roles in episodic television and television films. In 2017 he was cast in a recurring role in Marvel's Runaways. In 2019 he was cast as his father, Norm Nixon, in the HBO show, Winning Time: The Rise of the Lakers Dynasty.

Filmography

References

External links 
 
 DeVaughn Nixon 'Disney's Prom' Interview - YouTube

Living people
1983 births
African-American male actors
Male actors from Los Angeles
American male child actors
American male television actors
American male film actors
21st-century African-American people
20th-century African-American people